Buffalo Municipal Airport  is a city-owned public-use airport located two miles (3 km) southeast of the central business district of Buffalo, a city in Wright County, Minnesota, United States.

Although most U.S. airports use the same three-letter location identifier for the FAA and IATA, Buffalo Municipal Airport is assigned CFE by the FAA but has no designation from the IATA (which assigned CFE to Clermont-Ferrand Auvergne Airport in Clermont-Ferrand, Auvergne, France).

Facilities and aircraft 
For the 12-month period ending August 31, 2006, the airport had 22,350 aircraft operations, an average of 61 per day: 98% general aviation, 1% air taxi and 1% military. In November 2016, there were 67 aircraft based at this airport: 63 single-engine and 4 multi-engine.

The airport opened in 1966 with a single 2600 foot grass runway.  The runway was paved and lighted in 1986.

The current Arrivals and Departures building was built in 2007.

A Lockheed T-33A serial number 51-9235 is on display near the entrance of the airport.

Gallery

References

External links 
 Buffalo Municipal Airport
 

Airports in Minnesota
Buildings and structures in Wright County, Minnesota
Transportation in Wright County, Minnesota